Cychrus busatoi is a species of ground beetle in the subfamily of Carabinae. It was described by Cavazzuti in 2009.

References

busatoi
Beetles described in 2009